Help! I'm A Fish (also known as A Fish Tale) is a 2000 Danish-German-Irish traditionally animated science fantasy musical film directed by Stefan Fjeldmark, Greg Manwaring and Michael Hegner, and written by Stefan Fjeldmark, Karsten Kiilerich, John Stefan Olsen and Tracy J. Brown. It stars the voices of Alan Rickman, Terry Jones and a then-unknown Aaron Paul.

It was released on 6 October 2000 in Denmark, 10 August 2001 in United Kingdom, and 5 September 2006 in the United States. Danish teen-pop girl-group Little Trees performed the title track, "Help! I'm a Fish (Little Yellow Fish)", which was released as a single in the UK. Fellow Danish girl group Creamy also recorded a version of the song. The Belgian girl group K3 also recorded a Dutch version of the song for the movie. Animation production was split between A. Film A/S in Denmark, Munich Animation in Germany and Terraglyph Interactive Studios in Dublin, Ireland.

Plot
Fly is an impulsive 12-year-old, living with his little sister Stella, and parents Lisa and Bill. With their parents going out for the night, Fly and Stella are babysat by their Aunt Anna and her son Chuck, a cautious, overweight genetics prodigy. When Anna falls asleep, the children sneak out to go fishing. Caught in a high tide, they stumble across the boathouse of Professor MacKrill, an eccentric but kindly marine biologist. Reasoning that climate change will melt the polar icecaps to produce marine transgression within the next century, MacKrill reveals he has developed a potion to transform humans into fish, along with an antidote to reverse the process.

Mistaking it for lemonade, Stella drinks the potion and turns into a starfish, which Fly unknowingly throws out the window into the sea. Chuck discovers the mistake after Stella's transformation was caught on camera. The trio set out to find Stella, but their boat sinks in a storm. Fly and Chuck drink the potion, becoming a California flying fish and a moon jellyfish. Bill and Lisa return home to find Anna frantic with worry. Noticing that Fly's fishing equipment is gone, Bill, Lisa and Anna head to the beach to search for them but find only Fly's rollerblades instead. The adults fear the worst until Professor MacKrill, having survived the storm, arrives and shows them the video of Stella's transformation.

Underwater, the leaking antidote attracts a lemon shark and a pilot fish. They consume it, gaining intelligence and anthropomorphic appearances. Joe, the pilot fish, quickly uses the antidote to found a civilization of intelligent fish, intending to launch a revolution. The Shark becomes his dim-witted subordinate.

Fly, Chuck, and Stella reunite, accompanied by Sasha, a seahorse who Stella adopts. If they do not find the antidote within forty-eight hours, their transformations will be irreversible. The trio swim to Joe's domain, a sunken oil tanker, where Fly tries to steal the antidote. They are caught and interrogated by Joe about their intent and origins. He demands they manufacture more of the antidote, or the Shark will eat them. The children are imprisoned, guarded by an aggressive, militaristic king crab. Sasha frees the children, who manage to escape.

The children decide their best hope is to duplicate the antidote's formula themselves, gathering ingredients from around the ocean. Just as they complete the potion, Joe and his army appear. In a stand-off, Joe drinks the last of the original antidote, transforming his fins into hands. The children try to flee, but Fly is wounded by the Crab, who drinks the new antidote, declaring himself the King Crab. At the same time, MacKrill and Bill pass over in a makeshift boat powered by a water pump. The pump causes an underwater typhoon, sucking up all the army. The Shark eats the King Crab, but is incapacitated when he is sucked head-first into the pump.

Chuck remembers that MacKrill has another antidote in his laboratory. Formulating a plan, Chuck plans to carry Fly and Stella through dangerous seawater intake pipes back to the lab. Stella has to leave Sasha behind. The children flood MacKrill's laboratory to reach the potion, but Joe follows, stealing it. Fly pursues Joe into the pipe, tricking him into repeatedly drinking from the potion by challenging his intellect. Joe evolves into a deformed humanoid and drowns.

Fly drags the antidote back into the lab, Chuck uncorking it just as Lisa and Anna open the door to the flooded lab. Chuck and Stella become human once more, reuniting with their parents and MacKrill. After a few tense moments in which a stuffed fish is mistaken for the limp body of a Fly, the human Fly emerges from one of the lab's pipes with a broken leg.

Some time afterward, the family and MacKrill play on the beach. Sasha appears, so Chuck and MacKrill transform her into an actual horse, who Stella rides around with joy.

Cast

Production and music

On 4 October 1997, Stefan Fjeldmark (who is the film's writer), Michael Hegner and Greg Manwaring were hired and set to direct Help! I'm a Fish also known as A Fish Tale. Karsten Kiilerich, John Stefan Olsen and Tracy J. Brown wrote the script for the film. Anders Mastrup and Russell Boland produced the film for release in 2000. On 9 March 1998 it was announced that Jeff Pace, Sebastian Jessen, Michelle Westerson, Pil Neja, Alessandro Juliani, Aaron Paul, Morten Kernn Nielsen, Terry Jones, Søren Sætter-Lassen, Alan Rickman, Nis Bank-Mikkelsen, David Bateson, Dick Kaysø, Louise Fribo, Ulf Pilgaard, John Payne, Peter Gantzler, Teryl Rothery, Paprika Steen, Pauline Newstone, Ghita Nørby, Richard Newman and Zlatko Buric joined the film. On April 12, 1999, it was announced that Søren Hyldgaard would compose the music for the film. In 1996, a pilot trailer was completed, which has resurfaced on the Internet. The environment and object designs, animation, plot, and the character names, voices and designs are noticeably different from how they would eventually appear in the finished film.

Development and storyboarding of the film was completed in Denmark. Production then moved to Germany and Ireland for the final phases of animation, lighting, color and production in order to maximize tax credits offered to foreign film projects in Germany and Ireland. The film's soundtrack contains "Help! I'm a Fish (Little Yellow Fish)" performed by Little Trees, "Agloubablou" performed by Cartoons, "Ocean of Emotion" performed by Meja Beckman, "People Lovin Me" performed by Lou Bega, "Ocean Love/Ton Amour Ocean" performed by Anggun, "Close Your Eyes" performed by Patricia Kaas, "Interlude" performed by Terry Jones, "Fishtastic" performed by Terry Jones and "Intelligence" performed by Alan Rickman.

Release
The film was released theatrically on 6 October 2000 by HanWay Films and Nordisk Film and was released on DVD and VHS on 6 January 2003 by Movie Star. In North America, the English dub of the film was released in 2006 by Genius Products and in 2007 by Alliance Atlantis.

Box office
The film grossed $5.6 million in Denmark against an approximate $18 million budget.

Awards
In 2000, the movie won the Chicago International Children's Film Festival category Children's Jury Award.

Soundtrack

 Help! I'm a Fish (Little Yellow Fish) – Little Trees
 Do You Believe in Magic? – Loona
 Wooble Dee Bubble – Cartoons
 People Lovin' Me – Lou Bega
 Funky Sharks – Shaka feat. Sko
 Mother Nature – Little Trees
 Interlude (Professor) – Terry Jones
 Fishtastic – Terry Jones
 Ocean Love – Eddi Reader
 Close Your Eyes – Patricia Kaas
 Interlude (Jelly Fish) – Jeff Pace & Alessandro Juliani
 Suddenly – Solveig
 Ocean Of Emotion – Meja
 Intelligence – Alan Rickman
 Interlude (Goodbye) – Michelle Westerson
 Barracuda – Zindy featuring Pablo

Legacy
The film's stars Aaron Paul and Alan Rickman would later co-star again in the 2015 film Eye In The Sky, released shortly after Rickman's death. Paul expressed his regret that despite working with Rickman on Help! I'm A Fish and Eye in the Sky, they never got the chance to meet.

References

External links

2000 films
2000 animated films
Animated musical films
2000s children's fantasy films
Danish animated films
Danish independent films
English-language Danish films
English-language German films
English-language Irish films
HanWay Films films
Films about shapeshifting
Films set in Copenhagen
Films set in Denmark
Films set in the Atlantic Ocean
Animated films about fish
2000s children's comedy films
Children's drama films
Animated drama films
Animated comedy films
2000 comedy films
2000s children's animated films